The following is a list of The Incredible Hulk episodes. The series began with two, two-hour made-for-TV movies on November 4 and 27, 1977. Regular one-hour episodes began on March 10, 1978 and ended on May 12, 1982. It was created by Kenneth Johnson, produced by CBS, and ran for 80 episodes.

The Incredible Hulk follows the story of David Banner (played by Bill Bixby), a physician/scientist who, traumatized by the loss of his wife, douses himself with dangerously high levels of gamma radiation. He metamorphosizes into a giant, green hulk (Lou Ferrigno) whenever he becomes angry. The series chronicles Banner's attempts to find a cure for himself, as he is pursued across the United States by investigative newspaper reporter Jack McGee (Jack Colvin). The series was loosely based on the Marvel comic book of the same name.

After the cancellation of the series, three television movies aired on NBC (1988, 1989 and 1990). On July 28, 2006, season one was officially released on DVD. Season two was released in the United States on July 17, 2007. Seasons three and four were released in June 2008 to coincide with the release of the 2008 Marvel Studios film The Incredible Hulk.

Series overview

Episodes

Pilot movies (1977)

Season 1 (1978)

Season 2 (1978–79)

Season 3 (1979–80)

Season 4 (1980–81)

Season 5 (1981–82)

Reunion movies (1988–90)

References

External links

IncredibleHulkTVseries.com

Episodes
Lists of American science fiction television series episodes
Lists of Marvel Comics television series episodes